Ramón Aurelio Tejedor Sanz (Zaragoza, Spain, 18 February 1955) is a Spanish politician who belongs to the Spanish Socialist Workers' Party (PSOE) and who previously served as acting President of the Government of Aragon in early 1995.

References

1955 births
Living people
Presidents of the Government of Aragon
Spanish Socialist Workers' Party politicians
Members of the Cortes of Aragon